Lawrenceville is the name of several places:
United States
Lawrenceville, former name of Alleene, Arkansas
Lawrenceville, Georgia
Lawrenceville, Illinois
Lawrenceville, Indiana
Lawrenceville, New Jersey
The Lawrenceville School
Lawrenceville, Ohio
Lawrenceville, Pennsylvania
Lawrenceville (Pittsburgh), Pennsylvania
Lawrenceville, Virginia
Lawrenceville, West Virginia
Canada
Lawrenceville, Quebec

See also
Lawrence (disambiguation)
Lawrenceburg (disambiguation)